Bold Street is a street in Liverpool, England. It is known for its cafés and for the Church of St Luke, which is situated at the top end. The bottom end leads into the area surrounding Clayton Square, which is part of the main retail district of central Liverpool.  The bottom end contains more shops which are chain stores. Liverpool Central, a major hub of the Merseyrail rapid transit/commuter rail network, can also be accessed via an entrance on Bold Street next to The Lyceum, a post office which was Europe's first lending library.  The middle area contains bars as it leads towards Concert Square, a square containing clubs and bars, and the top end contains more independent shops and cafes. For the most part, Bold Street is pedestrianised and cars do not have access.

History
Bold Street was originally laid out as a ropewalk; a long thin area of land used in the manufacture of rope (the area is now known as 'Rope Walks').  They used to measure the rope from the top of Bold Street to the bottom because it was the standard length needed for sailing ships.
It was laid out for residences around 1780 and named after Jonas Bold, a noted sugar trader and banker. In 1802 Bold became Mayor of Liverpool.

Merchants that worked on the docks needed houses close by. Therefore, houses were constructed in Hanover Street first, followed by Duke Street and then Bold Street. The fields that were in the area earlier were also developed quickly into houses. Although there had been port-related industrial activity in the area, with roperies occupying the site of what is now Bold Street to supply the sailing ships, this intensified along with a demand for residential properties so that the merchants could be located close to their business interests.

Physician Jonathan Binns, an 18th-century abolitionist, was among those building a home on the street.

Notable buildings and places of interest
The Lyceum
Liverpool Social Forum
Concert Square

References in popular culture
The street is featured in a song of the same name by Liverpool-based singer-songwriter Eugene McGuinness, included on his debut EP, 'The Early Learnings of...', distributed by Domino Records in 2007.

See also
 List of restaurant districts and streets

References 

Shopping streets in Liverpool
Restaurant districts and streets in England
Streets in Liverpool